Catocala hoferi is a moth in the family Erebidae. It is found in China.

References

hoferi
Moths described in 2003
Moths of Asia